The Kalik 40 is a sailboat, that was designed by Gary Mull and first built in 1979. The design is out of production.

The design was developed from the Concept 40 and provided the basis for the Kalik 44 and the Ocean 40.

Production
The boat was built by Kyung-Il Yacht of South Korea.

Design
The Kalik 40 is a small recreational keelboat, built predominantly of fiberglass. It has a masthead sloop rig, a spade-type rudder and a fixed keel, available in three different lengths. It displaces  and carries  of ballast.

The boat has a PHRF racing average handicap of 96 with a high of 93 and low of 102.

Variants
Kalik 40
Base model with a  keel.
Kalik 40 DK
Model with a  keel.
Kalik 40 VDK
Model with a  keel.

See also
List of sailing boat types

References

Keelboats
1980s sailboat type designs
Sailing yachts
Sailboat type designs by Gary Mull
Sailboat types built by Kyung-Il Yacht